Princess Amalie Auguste of Anhalt-Dessau (18 August 1793 – 12 June 1854) was a German princess of Anhalt-Dessau who was Princess consort of Schwarzburg-Rudolstadt from 1816 to 1854 as the wife of Friedrich Günther, Prince of Schwarzburg-Rudolstadt.

Early life 
Auguste was born on 18 August 1793 in Dessau as the eldest child of Frederick, Hereditary Prince of Anhalt-Dessau, and his wife, Landgravine Amalie of Hesse-Homburg (daughter of Frederick V, Landgrave of Hesse-Homburg).

Marriage and issue
On 15 April 1816 she was married in Dessau to her first cousin, Frederick Günther, reigning Prince of Schwarzburg-Rudolstadt (son of Louis Frederick II, Prince of Schwarzburg-Rudolstadt, and his wife, Landgravine Caroline of Hesse-Homburg). They had three sons:
Prince Friedrich Günther of Schwarzburg-Rudolstadt (1818–1821)
Prince Günther of Schwarzburg-Rudolstadt (1821–1845)
Prince Gustav of Schwarzburg-Rudolstadt (1828–1837)

Death
Princess Auguste died on 12 June 1854 in Rudolstadt. Her widower, Prince Frederick Günther, remarried her own niece, Countess Helene of Reina (1835–1860), morganatic daughter of her brother George in 1855.

Her younger brother ruled the unified duchy of Anhalt from 1863 until his death in 1871 as Leopold IV.

Ancestors

References
 L. Renovanz: Chronik der fürstl. Schwarzburgischen Residenzstadt Rudolstadt, S. 49, L. Renovanz, 1860
 S. Obbarius: Rudolstadt u. seine romantischen Umgebungen, L. Renovanz, 1853

1793 births
1854 deaths
House of Ascania
House of Schwarzburg
People from Anhalt-Dessau
Auguste
Princesses of Schwarzburg
Royal reburials